Alfred Severin Høy (17 August 1885 – 17 June 1970) was a Norwegian engineer. He was born in Drammen, a son of Carl Anton Høy and Laurentze Margrethe Skougaard. He worked for Meraker Smelteverk from 1919, and was appointed manager of the plant from 1941 to 1950.

References

1885 births
1970 deaths
People from Drammen
20th-century Norwegian engineers